Aconchulinida is an order of Cercozoa in the subclass Filosia. The outer zone is clear ectoplasm and has many vacuoles. It has a single nucleus. Its size range from 10 to 400 micrometers.  It contains few genera, possibly including only Penardia, but usually also considered to encompass all of the Vampyrellidae. A study done in 2015 showed significant positive correlation between diversity of Aconchulinida and nutrient availability in the sediments.

References

3. Song, H., Zhang, Y., Leng, X., Zhang, Y., & Yu, Y. (2015). Aconchulinid testate amoebae play an important role in nutrient cycling in freshwater ecosystems. Soil Biology and Biochemistry, 82, 1-7. https://doi.org/10.1016/j.soilbio.2014.11.009

 
Cercozoa orders